Thryallis is a genus of beetles in the family Cerambycidae, containing the following species:

 Thryallis granulosus Bates, 1885
 Thryallis leucophaeus (White, 1855)
 Thryallis maculosus Thomson, 1858
 Thryallis noguerai Chemsak & McCarty, 1997
 Thryallis ocellatus Chemsak & McCarty, 1997
 Thryallis sallaei Bates, 1880
 Thryallis undatus (Chevrolat, 1834)

References

Anisocerini